The 2022 FIBA U16 European Championship was the 34th edition of the European basketball championship for national under-16 teams. It was played from 12 to 20 August 2022 in Skopje, North Macedonia. Lithuania men's national under-16 basketball team won the tournament and became the European champions for the second time.

Participating teams

  (Third place, 2019 FIBA U16 European Championship Division B)

  (Fourth place, 2019 FIBA U16 European Championship Division B)
  (Runners-up, 2019 FIBA U16 European Championship Division B)

  (Winners, 2019 FIBA U16 European Championship Division B)

First round
The draw of the first round was held on 15 February 2022 in Freising, Germany.

In the first round, the teams were drawn into four groups of four. All teams advance to the playoffs.

Group A

Group B

Group C

Group D

Playoffs

Main bracket

5th place bracket

9th place bracket

13th place bracket

Final standings

Awards

All-Tournament Team

  Mario Saint-Supery
  Nojus Indrusaitis
  Ben Avraham Saraf
  Mohamed Diakité
  Neoklis Avdalas
Source

References

2022
2022–23 in European basketball
International youth basketball competitions hosted by North Macedonia
FIBA U16
August 2022 sports events in Europe
Sports competitions in Skopje
FIBA